John Motley Morehead High School is a public high school located in Eden, North Carolina, serving students in the ninth through twelfth grade. Morehead High School is a part of the Rockingham County Schools school district.

History
The school opened in 1952, as Tri-City High School, to serve the then-separate communities of Eden – Leaksville, Spray, and Draper. The school gained its current name in 1958 in honor of John Motley Morehead III, the grandson of John Motley Morehead, who donated to a number of projects for the school. Among these projects were Carillon Bells and a football stadium and fieldhouse. Four building projects expanded the high school: a classroom and auditorium building in 1960, a library in 1968, a gymnasium in 1981, and the cafeteria and science building in 1991. Students from the former historically African American high school Douglass high school, were integrated into Morehead's student body in the fall of 1966. The industrial education center was housed on the school's campus through 1966. It became a countywide setting for vocational training. Later, it was removed and re-established at Rockingham Community College located in Wentworth, North Carolina.

As of August 2016, 53% of students are White, 22% of students are African American, and 25% of students are of other ethnicities.

Curriculum
Morehead provides students a variety of subjects and courses to take for either a standard or advanced diploma such as Math, science, Social Studies, English, and also Foreign language classes, Theater Arts etc.

Programs 
MHS also runs an Army Junior Reserve Officers' Training Corps (JROTC) program for students who may join the army instead of attending a College or four-year institution. Other programs include career and technical Education, career and college promise program.
Morehead also has a Health Science Program

Athletics 
MHS competes in the North Carolina High School Athletic Association and competes in a 3-A state  Conference. Morehead's biggest rivals are Reidsville High School and Rockingham County High School.

"Fall Sports": Cross country, Football, Volleyball

"Winter Sports ": Boys' JV Basketball, Boys' Varsity Basketball, Girls' JV Basketball, Girls' Varsity Basketball, co-ed Swimming, Wrestling

"Spring Sports": Boys' JV Baseball, Boys' Varsity Baseball, Girls' JV Softball, Girls' Varsity Softball, co-ed Track

Wrestling
The Morehead Panthers wrestling team won the NCHSAA 3A dual team state championship in 1998, 1999, 2002, 2003, 2006, 2014, and 2016. They were the NCHSAA 3A state tournament champions in 1998, 1999, 2006, 2014, and 2015.

Notable alumni
Norwood Creek, film and tv producer/editor and music video director
Antico Dalton, former NFL and Canadian Football League player
Takayo Siddle, American basketball coach

References 

Public high schools in North Carolina
Schools in Rockingham County, North Carolina
Educational institutions established in 1952
1952 establishments in North Carolina